The Sovereign's Servant is a 2007 Russian swashbuckler film written and directed by Oleg Ryaskov, and starring Dmitry Miller, Aleksandr Bukharov, Kseniya Knyazeva, Darya Semyonova and Alexei Chadov in the lead roles. It depicts the events of the Great Northern War, with a particular focus on the Battle of Poltava.

Plot
The action takes place at the time of the Swedish-Russian war of 1709. The King of France, Louis XIV, sends two duelists into exile: Antoine De La Bouche (Valery Malikov) is ordered to go to the camp of the King, Charles XII, of the Swedes and Charles de Brézé (Dmitry Miller) is sent to the camp of the Russian Tsar, Peter the First. Both Frenchmen face various dangers along their way. They witness the grand battle of Poltava from opposite sides. Court plots and romantic adventures stay in the past as both our milksops are plunged head first in the boiling pot of war and the horrors it brings into their lives, until they face on the Battle of Poltava.

After a duel, Charles is killed in the duel by De La Bouche. Then, Tsar Peter I asks Bouche about why he was exiled to Russia. He just wonders back to the past, where he and Charles prepared to be exiled. The last scene sets back to the past, when both went to Russia.

Cast
 Dmitry Miller as Sharl de Breze 
  as Grigoriy Voronov 
  as Sharlotta de Monterras
 Darya Semyonova as Anka
 Alexei Chadov as Angie
 Valeriy Malikov as Antoine de La Bouche
 Nikolai Chindyajkin as Polish Coaching Inn Keep
 Andrey Sukhov as Peter the Great
 Vladislav Demchenko as Prince Philipp
 Dmitry Shilyayev as King Louis XIV
 Andrey Ryklin as Alexander Menshikov
 Rodion Yurin as Count de Guiche
 Yelena Plaksina as Praskoviya
 Ivan Shibanov as Marquise von Shomberg
 Olga Artngoltz as Marquise Gretchen von Shomberg
 Eduard Flerov as King Charles XII
 Mariya Kozhevnikova as maidservant
 Yulia Mayboroda as maidservant
 Evgeny Menshov as usher

Release
The Sovereign's Servant was released in more than 20 countries, including:
Brazil, Portugal, Spain, Italy, Germany, Netherlands, Sweden, Finland, Denmark, France, Estonia, Latvia, Lithuania, Ukraine, Poland, United Arab Emirates, Australia, Israel.

A Director Cut was released on August 18, 2022.

Box office
 Fees in Russia    - 6.800.000  $US (theaters, TV and DVD)
 Fees in the World - 5.100.000  $US (theaters, TV and DVD)
 Fees total of     - 11.900.000 $US (theaters, TV and DVD)
 The budget is     - 6.600.000  $US
 Advertising       - 2.700.000  $US (Russia)
 Copies            - 385 (Russia)

References

External links
 
 
 

2007 films
2000s Russian-language films
2000s historical adventure films
Russian swashbuckler films
Russian action adventure films
Russian historical adventure films
2000s action war films
Russian action war films
Cultural depictions of Peter the Great
Films set in the 18th century
Cultural depictions of Charles XII of Sweden
Russian historical action films